Naenara is a North Korean intranet web browser software developed by the Korea Computer Center for use of the national Kwangmyong intranet. It is developed from a version of Mozilla Firefox and is distributed with the Linux-based operating system Red Star OS that North Korea developed due to licensing and security issues with Microsoft Windows.

Design
Naenara is a modified version of Mozilla Firefox. Red Star OS and Naenara were developed by the Korea Computer Center that states on its web page that it seeks to develop Linux-based software for use.

Naenara can be used to browse approximately 1,000 to 5,500 websites in the national Kwangmyong intranet.

When Naenara is run, it tries to contact an IP address at http://10.76.1.11/. The default search engine for the browser is Google Korea.

See also

Samjiyon tablet computer

References

External links

Computing and society
Internet in North Korea
Linux web browsers